Carmelo Mancuso (born 3 October 1965) is an Italian professional football coach and a former player.

Club career
He played for two seasons (six games, no goals) in the Serie A for Milan and Lecce.

Managerial career
He became a football coach after retiring as a professional footballer. He was the coach of the Primavera youth team of Messina in 2007–08 season.

In 2015, Mancuso became a head coach of Giarre.

On 28 August 2021, he was appointed head coach of FC Messina in Serie D. On 12 October 2021, he was fired after gaining one point in 5 games.

References

1965 births
Footballers from Palermo
Living people
Italian footballers
Association football defenders
A.C.R. Messina players
A.C. Milan players
A.C. Monza players
A.S.D. Giarre Calcio 1946 players
Ascoli Calcio 1898 F.C. players
U.S. Lecce players
Aurora Pro Patria 1919 players
Serie A players
Serie B players
Italian football managers
Serie D managers